The Bradenton Explorers were one of the eight original franchises that began play in the Senior Professional Baseball Association in . 

That season, the club compiled a record of 38-34, finishing in second place in the league's Northern Division, narrowly holding off the Orlando Juice.  Jim Morrison led the league with 17 home runs, and pitcher Rick Lysander added a league-high 11 saves. In the playoffs, the Explorers lost to the St. Petersburg Pelicans, who went on to become league champions.

However the following season, the team was relocated to Daytona Beach, becoming the Daytona Beach Explorers. The move was a result of the team losing $1 million during their first season. 

In Daytona the team had an 11-11 record and were in 4th place when the Senior Professional Baseball Association ceased operations on December 28, 1990.

Notable players

Willie Aikens
Gary Alexander
Dan Boone
Tom Brown
Doug Capilla
Stan Cliburn
Gene Clines
Al Cowens
John D'Acquisto
Steve Dillard
Chuck Dobson
Dave Freisleben
Wayne Garrett
Garth Iorg
Pat Kelly
Bruce Kison
Ken Kravec
Wayne Krenchicki
Ron LeFlore
Rick Lysander
Mickey Mahler
Tippy Martinez
Hal McRae
Danny Meyer
Tommy Moore
Omar Moreno
Jim Morrison
Graig Nettles
Jim Nettles
Wayne Nordhagen
Al Oliver
Rick Peterson
Jerry Royster
Manny Sanguillén
Earl Stephenson
Sammy Stewart

References

Senior Professional Baseball Association teams
1989 establishments in Florida
Baseball teams established in 1989
Sports in Bradenton, Florida
Defunct baseball teams in Florida
1989 disestablishments in Florida
Sports clubs disestablished in 1989
Baseball teams disestablished in 1990